Catherine Au Yeung Wai-sum (born 16 October 1984) is a sabre fencer from Hong Kong, China.

Au Yeung took up fencing with some of her friends. She joined the national team in 2004 after being noticed by a national coach at an inter-school competition. She won a team silver medal at the 2005 Asian Championships and a team bronze medal at the 2006 Asian Games. She won a silver medal in the 2010 Pattaya City World Cup. In the 2011 Summer Universiade she reached the semifinals after defeating Romania's Mihaela Bulică, then lost to another Romanian, Bianca Pascu, and came away with a bronze medal.

Au Yeung graduated in marketing from Hong Kong Polytechnic University.

Notes

Living people
1984 births
Hong Kong female sabre fencers
Place of birth missing (living people)
Asian Games medalists in fencing
Fencers at the 2002 Asian Games
Fencers at the 2006 Asian Games
Fencers at the 2010 Asian Games
Asian Games bronze medalists for Hong Kong
Medalists at the 2006 Asian Games
Medalists at the 2010 Asian Games
Universiade medalists in fencing
Universiade medalists for Hong Kong
Medalists at the 2011 Summer Universiade
21st-century Hong Kong women